Timebox may refer to:

 Timeboxing, a time management method
 Timebox (band), the 1960s musical group